Daniel P. Markey (June 27, 1857March 2, 1946) was a Michigan politician.

Early life 
Markey was born to parents James and Catherine Markey on June 27, 1857, in Bunker Hill Township, Ingham County, Michigan. Markey graduated from Pinckney High School. Markey was admitted to the bar in April 1881. In 1883, Markey was appointed probate judge.

Personal life 
Markey married Eva Gene Thompson in 1899. Together they had two children and one step child. Markey was a member of the Knights of the Maccabees.

Political career 
Markey was sworn in as a member of the Michigan House of Representatives from the Iosco County district on January 7, 1885. He served in this capacity until 1886. On January 5, 1887, he was sworn in as a member of the Michigan House of Representatives from the Ogemaw County district and served in the seat until 1888. During this term, he was also the Speaker of the Michigan House of Representatives.

Death 
Markey died in on March 2, 1946, at a hospital in Detroit. He is interred in Lakeside Cemetery.

References 

1857 births
1946 deaths
Speakers of the Michigan House of Representatives
Republican Party members of the Michigan House of Representatives
Burials in Michigan
19th-century American politicians
19th-century American judges